The Gran Premio Polla de Potrancas Group 1 flat horse race in Argentina open to three-year-old fillies run over a distance of 1,600 metres (0.99 mi) at Hipódromo Argentino de Palermo. It is the first race in the Argentinian Filly Triple Crown, and equivalent to the English 1000 Guineas Stakes. It is considered one of the principle races in defining the champion three-year-old filly, and generally occurs in September, near the beginning of a horse's three-year-old season.

History 
The Gran Premio Polla de Potrancas was first run in 1895.

For three years in a row, from 1991 to 1993, the winner was owned and bred by Haras La Quebrada, trained by Carlos Alberto Zarlengo, and ridden by Jacinto Rafael Herrera.

Records (since 1988) 
Speed record:

 1:33.26 – Southern Spring (1996)

Largest margin of victory:

 9 lengths – La Costa Azul (1993)
 9 lengths – Carta Embrujada (2021)

Most wins by a jockey:

 5 – Pablo Gustavo Falero (1997, 2003, 2007, 2008, 2011)
 4 – Jacinto Rafael Herrera (1991, 1992, 1993, 2000)

Most wins by a trainer:

 6 – Juan Carlos Etchechoury (1999, 2004, 2007, 2009, 2010, 2015)

Most wins by an owner:

 4 – Haras Vacacion (1988,1989, 1997, 2011)
 4 – Haras La Quebrada (1991, 1992, 1993, 2000)

Most wins by a breeder:

 4 – Haras La Biznaga (1999, 2004, 2017, 2019)
 4 – Haras Vacacion (1988,1989, 1997, 2011)
 4 – Haras La Quebrada (1991, 1992, 1993, 2000)

Lowest odds of a winner:

 1.45 – Southern Spring (1996)
 1.45 – Miss Terrible (2002)

Highest odds of a winner: 

 29.35 – Querida Rebeca (2013)

Winners since 1988

Earlier winners

References 

Triple Crown of Thoroughbred Racing
Horse races in Argentina
Flat horse races for three-year-olds